Sherzod Naimovich Fayziev (born 6 February 1992) is an Uzbekistani footballer who plays as a defender for Malaysia Super League side Sri Pahang.

Career

Fayziev started his career with Uzbekistani side Mash'al, where he suffered relegation to the Uzbekistani second tier. Before the 2016 season, Fayziev signed for Lokomotiv (Tashkent) in Uzbekistan. Before the 2020 season, he returned to Lokomotiv (Tashkent) Uzbekistani club . In 2022, he signed for tier 1 club Sri Pahang. On 18 June 2022, Fayziev debuted for Sri Pahang during a 1-2 defeat to Sabah FC.

References

External links
 

1992 births
Association football defenders
Expatriate footballers in Malaysia
FC AGMK players
FC Sogdiana Jizzakh players
FK Mash'al Mubarek players
Living people
Malaysia Super League players
PFC Lokomotiv Tashkent players
PFK Metallurg Bekabad players
Sri Pahang FC players
Uzbekistan Super League players
Uzbekistani expatriate footballers
Uzbekistani expatriate sportspeople in Malaysia
Uzbekistani footballers